Niallia is a genus of Gram-Positive rod-shaped bacteria in the family Bacillaceae from the order Bacillales. The type species of this genus is Niallia circulans.

Members of Niallia are previously species belonging to Bacillus, a genus that has long been recognized by the scientific community as displaying extensive polyphyly and phylogenetic heterogeneity due to the vague criteria previously used to assign species to this clade. Multiple studies using comparative phylogenetic analyses have been published in an attempt to clarify the evolutionary relationships between Bacillus species, resulting in the establishment of numerous novel genera such as Alkalihalobacillus, Brevibacillus, Solibacillus, Alicyclobacillus, Virgibacillus and Evansella. In addition, the genus Bacillus has been restricted to only include species closely related to Bacillus subtilis and Bacillus cereus.

The name Niallia was named after the British microbiologist Professor Niall A. Logan (Glasgow Caledonian University), for his many contributions to the systematics and uses of the members of the genus Bacillus.

Biochemical Characteristics and Molecular Signatures 
Members of this genus are facultatively anaerobic and found in diverse locations such as soil, sewage, food and human stool. All members are motile and produce endospores. The optimal growth temperature for Niallia is in the range of 30-37°C. Niallia circulans is an important bacterium used in aquaculture, bioremediation, water treatment and enzyme production. It is also an opportunistic pathogen that is able to cause sepsis in immunocompromised patients. Two conserved signature indels (CSIs) have been identified as unique for this genus in the proteins GAF domain-containing protein and DNA ligase D, which in most cases are exclusively shared by either all or most members of this genus. These CSIs were identified through analyses of genome sequences from Niallia species and provide a reliable means to distinguish Niallia from other Bacillaceae genera and bacteria in molecular terms.

Taxonomy 
Niallia, as of May 2021, contains a total of 5 species with validly published names. This genus was identified as a monophyletic clade and phylogenetically unrelated to other Bacillus species in studies examining the taxonomic relationships within Bacillus. This branching pattern is also observed in the Genome Taxonomy Database (GTDB).

A non-validly published species, "Bacillus tuaregi", is also found to group with other members of Niallia in phylogenetic trees as well as share the same molecular markers in the form of conserved signature indels (CSIs). However, its transfer was not officially proposed due to the lack of culture strain information. Further revision of this genus is required as additional genomes and novel species are discovered and assigned.

References 

Bacillaceae
Bacteria genera